Bardas Phokas (or Phocas) (–13 April 989) was an eminent Byzantine general who took a conspicuous part in three revolts for and against the ruling Macedonian dynasty.

First rebellion 
Bardas was a scion of the Phokas family, the most prominent Byzantine aristocratic clan in the 10th century. His father Leo Phokas the Younger was a curopalates and brother to the Emperor Nikephoros II Phokas. Even as a young man, Bardas gained a reputation for his great expertise in the science of war:

If his military career was quick to peak, it was even quicker to collapse. Upon his uncle's death in 969, Phokas and his family rebelled against the new emperor and their own cousin, John I Tzimiskes. Bardas was proclaimed emperor by troops stationed at Caesarea, but their rebellion was extinguished by another skilled commander, Bardas Skleros. Phokas and his relatives were captured and exiled to the island of Chios, where he would spend the following seven years.

Phokas versus Skleros 

In 978 Bardas was delivered from his prison cell by the eunuch Basil Lekapenos, Basil II's uncle and de facto regent. He was dispatched in disguise to his native Cappadocia to stir up the local aristocracy against Skleros, who had revolted against imperial authorities and advanced to the Hellespont. Despite several initial setbacks, and with the assistance of a Georgian army led by Tornikios, Phokas eventually suppressed the revolt, gaining victory in single combat with Skleros. For his vital services to the crown, he was rewarded with a coveted office of Domestic of the Scholae and at once led the Byzantine armies to reconquer Aleppo from the Saracens. Later, to quote Psellos, "he was given the privilege of a triumph and took his place among the personal friends of his sovereign."

Second rebellion 

While Constantine VIII was easily swayed by his advisers, his brother Basil II was apparently irked by their supremacy. Basil's energy showed that he was determined to take the administration into his own hands and personally control the army. His growing independence alarmed both Basil Lekapenos and Phokas. In 987 they entered into secret negotiations with their former enemy, Skleros, on the understanding that the empire would be partitioned if they succeeded in their revolt against the emperors.

In a campaign that curiously mimicked Skleros' revolt a decade earlier, Phokas proclaimed himself emperor and overran most of Asia Minor. "It was no longer in imagination, but in very truth, that he put on the imperial robes, with the emperor's crown and the royal insignia of purple", says Psellos.

After relegating his colleague Skleros to a prison, Phokas proceeded to lay siege to Abydos, thus threatening to blockade the Dardanelles. At this point Basil II obtained timely aid, in the form of Varangian mercenaries, from his brother-in-law Vladimir, the Rus prince of Kiev, and marched to Abydos.

The two armies were facing each other, when Phokas galloped forward, seeking personal combat with the Emperor who was riding in front of the lines. Just as he prepared to charge at Basil, however, Phokas suffered a seizure, fell from his horse, and was found to be dead (April 13, 989). His head was cut off and brought to Basil. This ended the rebellion.

Family 

By his marriage to a cousin, one Adralestina, Bardas left two sons, Leo and Nikephoros (died 1022). His grandson and namesake, Bardas Phokas, was blinded by imperial authorities in 1025. It is believed that the Cretan family of the Phokades descends from him.

References 

Byzantine generals
Byzantine usurpers
10th-century Byzantine people
940 births
989 deaths
Year of birth uncertain
Bardas 02
Generals of Basil II
Domestics of the Schools